Suelen Pinto (born 4 October 1987) is a Brazilian female volleyball player. With her club SESI-SP she competed at the 2014 FIVB Volleyball Women's Club World Championship.

Awards

Individual

 2004 U20 South American Championship – "Best Receiver"
 2005 Pan-American Cup – "Best Receiver"
 2008–09 Brazilian Superliga – "Best Receiver" 
 2014 South American Club Championship – "Best Libero"
 2017–18 Brazilian Superliga – "Best Digger" 
 2018 FIVB Nations League – "Best Libero"

Clubs
 2013–14 Brazilian Superliga –  Runner-up, with SESI-SP
 2017–18 Brazilian Superliga –  Champion, with Dentil/Praia Clube
 2018–19 Brazilian Superliga –  Runner-up, with Dentil/Praia Clube
 2020–21 Brazilian Superliga –  Runner-up, with Dentil/Praia Clube
 2021–22 Brazilian Superliga –  Runner-up, with Dentil/Praia Clube
 2014 South American Club Championship –  Champion, with SESI-SP
 2019 South American Club Championship –  Runner-up, with Dentil/Praia Clube
 2020 South American Club Championship –  Runner-up, with Dentil/Praia Clube
 2021 South American Club Championship –  Champion, with Dentil/Praia Clube
 2022 South American Club Championship –  Runner-up, with Dentil/Praia Clube

External links
 profile at FIVB.org

References

1987 births
Living people
Brazilian women's volleyball players
Place of birth missing (living people)
Liberos
Expatriate volleyball players in Italy
Brazilian expatriates in Italy
Brazilian expatriate sportspeople
Sportspeople from Belo Horizonte
21st-century Brazilian women